There are at least 250 named mountain passes in Wyoming.

Wyoming  is a state in the mountain region of the Western United States.  Wyoming is the 10th most extensive, but the least populous and the 2nd least densely populated of the 50 United States.  The western two thirds of the state is covered mostly with the mountain ranges and rangelands in the foothills of the Eastern Rocky Mountains, while the eastern third of the state is high elevation prairie known as the High Plains. 

 Kagevah Pass, Sublette County, Wyoming, el. 
 Kessler Gap, Goshen County, Wyoming, el. 
 Kingman Pass, Park County, Wyoming, el. 
 Knapsack Col, Sublette County, Wyoming, el. 
 Lankin Gap, Fremont County, Wyoming, el. 
 Latham Pass, Converse County, Wyoming, el. 
 Lester Pass, Sublette County, Wyoming, el. 
 Lovely Pass, Park County, Wyoming, el. 
 Lower Dugway, Carbon County, Wyoming, el. 
 Manuel Gap, Sweetwater County, Wyoming, el. 
 Marston Pass, Fremont County, Wyoming, el. 
 McCann Pass, Goshen County, Wyoming, el. 
 McCompsey Pass, Goshen County, Wyoming, el. 
 McDougal Pass, Lincoln County, Wyoming, el. 
 McGinnis Pass, Goshen County, Wyoming, el. 
 McRae Gap, Natrona County, Wyoming, el. 
 Mexican Pass, Hot Springs County, Wyoming, el. 
 Minnies Gap, Sweetwater County, Wyoming, el. 
 Mist Creek Pass, Park County, Wyoming, el. 
 Moose Basin Divide, Teton County, Wyoming, el. 
 Morton Pass, Albany County, Wyoming, el. 
 Mosquito Pass, Teton County, Wyoming, el. 
 Mount Hunt Divide, Teton County, Wyoming, el. 
 Mount Meek Pass, Teton County, Wyoming, el. 
 Mud Pass, Teton County, Wyoming, el. 
 Muddy Gap, Carbon County, Wyoming, el. 
 Mule Creek Pass, Albany County, Wyoming, el. 
 Munkres Pass, Johnson County, Wyoming, el. 
 No Mans Pass, Fremont County, Wyoming, el. 
 Nord Pass, Teton County, Wyoming, el. 
 Norris Pass, Teton County, Wyoming, el. 
 North Indian Creek Pass, Lincoln County, Wyoming, el. 
 Oberg Pass, Carbon County, Wyoming, el. 
 Packsaddle Pass, Teton County, Wyoming, el. 
 Paintbrush Divide, Teton County, Wyoming, el. 
 Petes Gap, Carbon County, Wyoming, el. 
 Phelps Pass, Teton County, Wyoming, el. 
 Phillips Pass, Teton County, Wyoming, el. 
 Photo Pass, Fremont County, Wyoming, el. 
 Pickle Pass, Lincoln County, Wyoming, el. 
 Pierpont Pass, Park County, Wyoming, el. 
 Piney Pass, Park County, Wyoming, el. 
 Porcupine Pass, Sublette County, Wyoming, el. 
 Powder River Pass, Johnson County, Wyoming, el. 
 Pritchard Pass, Teton County, Wyoming, el. 
 Quaking Asp Gap, Fremont County, Wyoming, el. 
 Quealy Gap, Carbon County, Wyoming, el. 
 Ram Pass, Sublette County, Wyoming, el. 
 Rampart Pass, Park County, Wyoming, el. 
 Rattlesnake Pass, Carbon County, Wyoming, el. 
 Red Pass, Lincoln County, Wyoming, el. 
 Redenbaugh Pass, Converse County, Wyoming, el. 
 Reed Pass, Albany County, Wyoming, el. 
 Republic Pass, Park County, Wyoming, el. 
 Richards Gap, Sweetwater County, Wyoming, el. 
 Riddle Cut, Carbon County, Wyoming, el. 
 Rock Chuck Pass, Sheridan County, Wyoming, el. 
 Rocky Gap, Lincoln County, Wyoming, el. 
 Rocky Gap, Carbon County, Wyoming, el. 
 Rocky Gap, Natrona County, Wyoming, el. 
 Rocky Pass, Platte County, Wyoming, el. 
 Salt River Pass, Lincoln County, Wyoming, el. 
 Sand Gap, Sweetwater County, Wyoming, el. 
 Scenic Pass, Fremont County, Wyoming, el. 
 Schofield Pass, Converse County, Wyoming, el. 
 Session Pass, Uinta County, Wyoming, el. 
 Seward Pass, Platte County, Wyoming, el. 
 Shannon Pass, Sublette County, Wyoming, el. 
 Sheep Pass, Lincoln County, Wyoming, el. 
 Sheridan Pass, Fremont County, Wyoming, el. 
 Shoshone Pass (Bilíaliche, "like a tepee door" ), Park County, Wyoming, el. 
 Silver Gate, Park County, Wyoming, el. 
 Simpson Gap, Carbon County, Wyoming, el. 
 Sioux Pass, Fremont County, Wyoming, el. 
 Sioux Pass, Natrona County, Wyoming, el. 
 Sixmile Gap, Carbon County, Wyoming, el. 
 Smoky Gap, Natrona County, Wyoming, el. 
 Snow Pass, Park County, Wyoming, el. 
 Snowshoe Pass, Park County, Wyoming, el. 
 Snowshoe Pass, Big Horn County, Wyoming, el. 
 Snowy Range Pass, Albany County, Wyoming, el. 
 South Pass, Fremont County, Wyoming, el. 
 Spring Gap, Uinta County, Wyoming, el. 
 Stone Pillar Pass, Sublette County, Wyoming, el. 
 Summit of the Original South Pass, Fremont County, Wyoming, el. 
 Sunrise Pass, Albany County, Wyoming, el. 
 Sweetwater Gap, Fremont County, Wyoming, el. 
 Sylvan Pass, Park County, Wyoming, el. 
 Telephone Pass, Lincoln County, Wyoming, el. 
 Tepee Pass, Fremont County, Wyoming, el. 
 Teton Pass, Teton County, Wyoming, el. 
 Texas Pass, Sublette County, Wyoming, el. 
 The Cut, Park County, Wyoming, el. 
 The Gap, Natrona County, Wyoming, el. 
 The Gap, Campbell County, Wyoming, el. 
 The Narrows, Lincoln County, Wyoming, el. 
 The Narrows, Sweetwater County, Wyoming, el. 
 The Narrows, Sublette County, Wyoming, el. 
 The Narrows, Park County, Wyoming, el. 
 The Narrows, Lincoln County, Wyoming, el. 
 The Rim, Sublette County, Wyoming, el. 
 The Slip, Johnson County, Wyoming, el. 
 Thompson Pass, Sublette County, Wyoming, el. 
 Threlkeld Pass, Sublette County, Wyoming, el. 
 Titsworth Gap, Sweetwater County, Wyoming, el. 
 Togwotee Pass, Teton County, Wyoming, el. 
 Toll Gap, Johnson County, Wyoming, el. 
 Two Ocean Pass, Teton County, Wyoming, el. 
 U T Pass, Natrona County, Wyoming, el. 
 Union Pass, Fremont County, Wyoming, el. 
 Virden Pass, Converse County, Wyoming, el. 
 Vista Pass, Sublette County, Wyoming, el. 
 Wagner Pass, Lincoln County, Wyoming, el. 
 Washakie Pass, Sublette County, Wyoming, el. 
 Weiser Pass, Fremont County, Wyoming, el. 
 West Fork Pass, Converse County, Wyoming, el. 
 West Pass, Sheridan County, Wyoming, el. 
 Whiskey Gap, Carbon County, Wyoming, el. 
 White Pass, Fremont County, Wyoming, el. 
 White Saddle, Lincoln County, Wyoming, el. 
 Wilson Gap, Carbon County, Wyoming, el. 
 Windy Gap, Lincoln County, Wyoming, el. 
 Windy Gap, Fremont County, Wyoming, el. 
 Windy Gap, Fremont County, Wyoming, el. 
 Wolf Gap, Natrona County, Wyoming, el. 
 Woodchuck Pass, Sheridan County, Wyoming, el. 
 Woodruff Lower Narrows, Uinta County, Wyoming, el. 
 Woodruff Upper Narrows, Uinta County, Wyoming, el. 
 Wright Divide, Lincoln County, Wyoming, el. 
 Youngs Pass, Carbon County, Wyoming, el.

See also
 List of mountain ranges in Wyoming

Notes

 
Wyoming
Mountain passes
Mountain passes